Zarandeh is a village in Binalud Rural District, in the Central District of Nishapur County, Razavi Khorasan Province, Iran. At the 2006 census, its population was 229, in 66 families.

References 

Populated places in Nishapur County